Teatro Municipal, Theatro Municipal, Théâtre Municipal or Teatro Municipale (= Municipal theatre) may refer to:

Théâtre municipal d'Albi
Teatro Municipal de Caracas
Teatro Municipal de Chacao
Théâtre municipal de Grenoble
Théâtre municipal du Mans
Théâtre municipal de Mont-de-Marsan
Théâtre municipal d'Orange
Teatro Municipal de Puerto Cabello
Teatro Municipal de Valencia
Teatro Municipal (Lima)
Theatro Municipal (Rio de Janeiro)
Teatro Municipal (Santiago)
Theatro Municipal (São Paulo)
Teatro Municipal (San Nicolás de los Arroyos)
Teatro Municipale (Piacenza)
Teatro Municipale (Reggio Emilia)